Starovoyt or Starovoit (Cyrillic: Старовойт) is an East Slavic surname. Notable people with the surname include:

Roman Starovoyt (born 1972), Russian politician
Natalya Starovoyt (born 1962), Russian actress

See also
 
 Starovoytov

East Slavic-language surnames